The School of Social Welfare of the University of California, Berkeley, was established June 1, 1944 and is located in Haviland Hall on the UC Berkeley campus. Its focus is to prepare graduates to become agents of social change through direct practice, agency management, policymaking, and leading new discoveries that address the grand challenges confronting society. Berkeley Social Welfare offers the Bachelor of Arts in Social Welfare through the College of Letters and Science (L&S), the M.S.W., and the Ph.D. Haviland Hall includes its own library, The Social Research Library, which was founded in 1957 and contains approximately 34,400 volumes and 200 active serial titles. The library originally housed volumes specifically for the social work field and expanded in 2014 to include education, psychology, public policy. The library also maintains an Indigenous Social Work space.

Social welfare as a field of study was originally located in the Economics Department and was called "social economics". Professor Jessica Blanche Peixotto, the second woman to earn at Ph.D. at Berkeley, was hired in 1904 to teach courses in sociology and by 1912 had shaped a curriculum in social economics focused on the poor. Professor Peixotto became the first woman at Berkeley to achieve tenured faculty status in 1918. Along with her colleagues, Lucy Ward Stebbins and Emily Noble Plehn, they developed a graduate-level curriculum in social work that same year. By 1927 these courses led to certificates in child and family services and in medical social work. An independent Department of Social Welfare was established in 1939 and the certificates were replaced with a professional Master of Arts degree in 1942. Professor Harry Cassidy, the Public Welfare Director for British Columbia became the first Dean of the new School of Social Welfare in 1944. He insisted the program be called "social welfare" to encompass more than social work.

Students
Undergraduates majoring in social welfare are enrolled in the College of Letters and Science (L&S), while the upper-division major is administered by the School of Social Welfare. Social welfare is an undergraduate major in L&S.

There are approximately 27 doctoral and 197 master's students in the School. At the graduate level, Berkeley Social Welfare offers: a full-time, two year M.S.W. program; a part-time, three year M.S.W. program; a part-time, advanced standing, one year M.S.W. program; a concurrent, three year M.S.W./M.P.H. program; a concurrent, three year M.S.W./M.P.P. program; a concurrent, four year M.S.W/J.D. program; a combined M.S.W./Ph.D. program, and a Ph.D. program. Standalone and concurrent degree M.S.W. students must participate in mandatory field education, throughout their course of study, which requires them to complete a set amount of internship hours at agencies related to their career goals.

The School of Social Welfare maintains 12 research units:
 The California Child Welfare Indicators Project
 The California Social Work Education Center
 The Digital Health & Access Equity Lab
 Risk Resilience Researc
 The Guizhou Berkeley Big Data Innovation Research Center
 The Sexual Health & Reproductive Equity Program
 The Center for the Advanced Study of Aging Services
 The Center for Comparative Family Welfare and Poverty Research
 The Center for Prevention Research in Social Welfare
 The Mack Center on Nonprofit & Public Sector Management
 The Mack Center on Mental Health & Social Conflict
 The Mental Health and Social Welfare Research Group

References

External links

University of California, Berkeley buildings
University of California, Berkeley
Educational institutions established in 1957
1957 establishments in California